The 6th congressional district of Tennessee is a congressional district in Middle Tennessee.
It has been represented by Republican John Rose since January 2019.

Current boundaries
The district is located in north-central Tennessee and borders Kentucky to the north. It is currently composed of the following counties:
Cannon, Clay, Cumberland, DeKalb, Fentress, Jackson, Macon, Overton, Pickett, Putnam, Smith, Sumner, Trousdale, White, and Van Buren. The district also contains parts of Davidson, Scott, Warren, and Wilson counties.

Characteristics
Much of the sixth district is rural and wooded. It is spread across the geographic regions known as the Cumberland Plateau, the Highland Rim, and the Central Basin. The area is known for its waterfalls, such as Burgess Falls and Cummins Falls. Much of the western part of the district is located in the Nashville metropolitan area, along with a portion of Nashville itself.

With close access to interstates 24, 40, and 65, subdivisions are sprouting almost exponentially, fast filling with new economy managers. Recently, many companies have opened either manufacturing or distribution centers in the 6th district. This includes Amazon and Bridgestone-Firestone in Lebanon, gun manufacturer Beretta in Gallatin, and clothing manufacturer Under Armour in Mt. Juliet.

Politically speaking, the region was traditionally a "Yellow Dog Democrat" district. However, it began shifting rightward as Nashville's suburbs bled into the district and the rural counties trended Republican. It supported Bill Clinton in 1992, partly due to the presence of Al Gore, who represented it from 1977 to 1985, as Clinton's running mate. However, it has not supported a Democrat for president since. Longtime Democratic incumbent Bart Gordon consistently won reelection easily even as the district swung rightward after the turn of the millennium. By the mid-2000s, however, it was believed that the Democrats would have a hard time keeping the seat after Gordon retired.

Gordon retired in 2010, and Republican state senator Diane Black won the seat in a landslide, proving just how Republican this district had become. The 2010 redistricting made the district even more Republican, even as its longtime anchor of Murfreesboro was drawn into the neighboring 4th District. Since 2012, no Democrat has won an entire county within the district in any presidential, gubernatorial, senate, or congressional election. Indeed, no Democrat has crossed the 30 percent mark in the district since Gordon's retirement.

According to the 2010 census, the five largest cities are Hendersonville (51,372), Cookeville (30,425), Gallatin (30,278), Lebanon (26,190), and Mt. Juliet (23,671).

Election results from presidential races 
Results Under Old Lines (2013-2023)

History
Prior to the 1980 census, when Tennessee picked up a district, most of what is now the 6th district was in the 4th district.

During the 1940s, this area was represented by Albert Gore, Sr. of Carthage. Gore was elected to the United States Senate in 1952, where he was instrumental in creating the Interstate Highway system.

From 1953 to 1977, the area was represented by Joe L. Evins of Smithville. Evins's nephew, Dan Evins, was the founder of Cracker Barrel Old Country Store restaurant/retail chain. Cracker Barrel's headquarters are still located in Lebanon.

In 1976, Evins was succeeded by Al Gore, then-future Vice President and son of Albert Gore, Sr. He was representing the area when much of it was moved into the present 6th district.

Shortly following the redistricting into the 6th district, Gore was elected to the United States Senate. He was then succeeded by former Tennessee Democratic Party chairman Bart Gordon of Murfreesboro. Gordon held the post for the next 26 years, generally with little difficulty. The only year he faced serious opposition was 1994, when attorney Steve Gill ran against him. Gordon defeated Gill by only one percentage point.

Diane Black of Gallatin was elected in the Republican landslide of 2010 when Gordon retired after 26 years in Congress. Black's victory marked the first time that much of the district had been represented by a Republican since 1921, and for only the second time since Reconstruction.

After four terms in Congress, Black ran for Governor of Tennessee in 2018, but lost in the Republican primary. Businessman former Tennessee Agriculture Commissioner John Rose, a Republican from Cookeville, was elected to replace her.

List of members representing the district

See also

Tennessee's congressional districts
List of United States congressional districts

References

 Congressional Biographical Directory of the United States 1774–present
 Political Graveyard database of Tennessee congressmen

External links
 Congress.com: Tennessee Congressional districts

06
Bedford County, Tennessee
Cannon County, Tennessee
Clay County, Tennessee
DeKalb County, Tennessee
Jackson County, Tennessee
Macon County, Tennessee
Marshall County, Tennessee
Overton County, Tennessee
Putnam County, Tennessee
Robertson County, Tennessee
Rutherford County, Tennessee
Smith County, Tennessee
Sumner County, Tennessee
Trousdale County, Tennessee
Wilson County, Tennessee
Al Gore
Constituencies established in 1813
1813 establishments in Tennessee